Tranquillity is a census-designated place (CDP) in Fresno County, California, United States. The population was 799 at the 2010 census, down from 813 at the 2000 census. Tranquillity High School is the only high school in Tranquillity.

Geography

History
The first post office opened in Tranquillity in 1910.

The town received recognition during a September 29, 1970 episode of the long-running television show Hee-Haw. It was part of the show's weekly "salute" feature, and co-host Buck Owens acknowledged the town's population, which at the time was 750. 

The episode had Ray Charles and Lynn Anderson as musical guests.

Demographics

2010
The 2010 United States Census reported that Tranquillity had a population of 799. The racial makeup of Tranquillity was 504 (63.1%) White, 9 (1.1%) African American, 13 (1.6%) Native American, 2 (0.3%) Asian, 0 (0.0%) Pacific Islander, 251 (31.4%) from other races, and 20 (2.5%) from two or more races. Hispanic or Latino of any race were 637 persons (79.7%).

The Census reported that 799 people (100% of the population) lived in households, 0 (0%) lived in non-institutionalized group quarters, and 0 (0%) were institutionalized.

There were 229 households, out of which 120 (52.4%) had children under the age of 18 living in them, 141 (61.6%) were opposite-sex married couples living together, 21 (9.2%) had a female householder with no husband present, 20 (8.7%) had a male householder with no wife present.  There were 15 (6.6%) unmarried opposite-sex partnerships, and 0 (0%) same-sex married couples or partnerships. 38 households (16.6%) were made up of individuals, and 13 (5.7%) had someone living alone who was 65 years of age or older. The average household size was 3.49.  There were 182 families (79.5% of all households); the average family size was 3.98.

The population was spread out, with 267 people (33.4%) under the age of 18, 55 people (6.9%) aged 18 to 24, 206 people (25.8%) aged 25 to 44, 177 people (22.2%) aged 45 to 64, and 94 people (11.8%) who were 65 years of age or older.  The median age was 32.7 years. For every 100 females, there were 106.5 males.  For every 100 females age 18 and over, there were 103.1 males.

The homeowner vacancy rate was 2.0%; the rental vacancy rate was 13.3%.  478 people (59.8% of the population) lived in owner-occupied housing units and 321 people (40.2%) lived in rental housing units.

2000
As of the census of 2000, there were 813 people, 236 households, and 193 families residing in the CDP. The racial makeup of the CDP was 48.83% White, 0.74% Black or African American, 1.72% Native American, 3.69% Asian, 42.07% from other races, and 2.95% from two or more races.  64.94% of the population were Hispanic or Latino of any race.

There were 236 households, out of which 44.5% had children under the age of 18 living with them, 66.5% were married couples living together, 10.2% had a female householder with no husband present, and 17.8% were non-families. 15.7% of all households were made up of individuals, and 7.6% had someone living alone who was 65 years of age or older.  The average household size was 3.44 and the average family size was 3.82.

In the CDP, the population was spread out, with 33.6% under the age of 18, 9.6% from 18 to 24, 25.6% from 25 to 44, 21.9% from 45 to 64, and 9.3% who were 65 years of age or older.  The median age was 30 years. For every 100 females, there were 114.5 males.  For every 100 females age 18 and over, there were 101.5 males.

The median income for a household in the CDP was $42,857, and the median income for a family was $60,208. Males had a median income of $29,250 versus $17,222 for females. The per capita income for the CDP was $13,128.  About 12.2% of families and 7.9% of the population were below the poverty line, including 5.2% of those under age 18 and 17.7% of those age 65 or over.

References

Census-designated places in Fresno County, California
Populated places established in 1910
Census-designated places in California